Mondavio is a comune (municipality) in the Province of Pesaro e Urbino in the Italian region Marche, located about  west of Ancona and about  south of Pesaro.

Main sights
Rocca di Mondavio, a Renaissance castle designed by Francesco di Giorgio Martini and built between 1482 and 1492.
Santi Pietro e Paterniano
Santa Maria della Quercia
San Francesco
Civic Museum and Pinacoteca, Mondavio

Twin towns
 Fontenay-Trésigny, France
 Vilassar de Dalt, Spain

References

External links
 Official website
  The Mondavio guide

 
Cities and towns in the Marche